Minkler is an unincorporated community in Skagit County, in the U.S. state of Washington.

History
A post office called Minkler was established in 1903, and remained in operation until 1914. The community was named after B. D. Minkler, a state legislator.

References

Unincorporated communities in Skagit County, Washington
Unincorporated communities in Washington (state)